The War Doctor, announced in October 2015, is a Big Finish Productions audio play series based on the TV show Doctor Who. It sees the return of Sir John Hurt as the War Doctor, a role he previously portrayed in the TV story "The Name of the Doctor" as well as more prominently in the 50th Anniversary special "The Day of the Doctor". The series consists of four box sets, each made up of three hour-long episodes, the first released in December 2015, the remaining three volumes followed across 2016 and into 2017.

Big Finish Productions announced October 2020 that the War Doctor would return portrayed by actor Jonathon Carley, stepping in for the late John Hurt. Nicholas Briggs stated in relation to the recast: "I can confidently say that what Jonathon is doing here will be a fitting tribute to John, in honour of his great work in the role.". Four volumes were announced to be released beginning June 2021.

Cast

Episodes
The War Doctor faces the Daleks in four seasons of the Time War.

The War Doctor

Series 1: Only the Monstrous (2015)

Series 2: Infernal Devices (2016)

Series 3: Agents of Chaos (2016)

Series 4: Casualties of War (2017)
Sir John Hurt died on 25 January 2017. Recording of the series had been completed and was released posthumously.

The War Doctor Begins

Series 1: Forged in Fire (2021)

Series 2: Warbringer (2021)

Series 3: Battlegrounds (2022)

Series 4: He Who Fights Monsters (2022)

Series 5: Comrades-in-Arms

Series 6: Enemy Mine

Awards and nominations

References

Audio plays based on Doctor Who
Big Finish Productions
Doctor Who spin-offs
War Doctor stories